Samay may refer to:

 Samay, a unit of time
 Samaya (1975 film), an Oriya film
 Samay: When Time Strikes, 2003 action film
 Samaya, Buddhist order as part of the Abhiseka ceremony of empowerment
 Samay (band), a Leeds-based world music group
 Samay, Hindi News Channel of Sahara India Pariwar
 Samay, a mythological figure in the Casamance (Senegal)